Athiradi Padai in Tamil / Samaram in Telugu is a 1994 Indian bilingual action film directed by R. K. Selvamani. The film stars Rahman, Suman, and Roja  whilst Lakshmi, Vijayakumar and Silk Smitha play supporting roles. It was released on 10 February 1994.

Plot 
The film is loosely based on acid attack on Chandralekha IAS.

IAS officer chitralekha (Lakshmi) refuses to clear public land at low price to Adhiseshan (Puneet Issar). Adiseshan gave 30 crores to CM Ramachandra Moorthy (Kota srinivasa Rao/Vinu Chakravarthy) Adiseshan tries to halt investigation by throwing acid on chitralekha's face, sending goons to attack her daughter bharathi (Roja), giving sedated chocolate to chitra's younger daughter and humiliating her in public. When the IAS officer refuse to back down, Adiseshan kills her by hanging and make it look like suicide.

Bharathi (Roja) receives a courier containing evidences of Adiseshan and politicians scam. She plans to expose this to public through press meet. But another politician (Mansoor Ali Khan) who promised to help her betrays and her younger sister is raped and killed by Adiseshan. She kills Mansoor Ali Khan in rage and sentenced to prison. She also finds her father (Vijayakumar) is in prison on false case.

In prison, she suffers unnecessary torture at hands of police and finally she joins rahman's gang and uncovers the truth. Finally she kills Adiseshan (Puneet Issar).

Cast 
Rahman
Suman
Roja as Bharathi
Vinu Chakravarthy / Kota Srinivasa Rao
Vijayakumar as Roja's father
Silk Smitha
Puneet Issar as Adiseshan
Lakshmi as Chitralekha IAS
Mansoor Ali Khan
R. Sundarrajan / Babu Mohan

Soundtrack 
The music was composed by Ilaiyaraaja.
Tamil

Telugu

Reception 
Malini Mannath of The Indian Express wrote that Selvamani's "Athiradippadai [..] has more of imagination gone astray and less of reality" and "unlike the smooth transition from scene to scene in his earlier films, here the narration is jerky". R. P. R. of Kalki found cinematography as the only appreciable aspect of the film calling angles and lighting of Hollywood type and found no other positive aspects from the film.

References

External links 

1990s Tamil-language films
1994 action films
1994 films
1994 multilingual films
Films directed by R. K. Selvamani
Films scored by Ilaiyaraaja
Indian action films
Indian films about revenge
Indian multilingual films